1,5-Dihydroxynaphthalene is an organic compound with the formula CH(OH).  It is one of several isomers of dihydroxynaphthalene.  A white solid, degraded samples often appear grey to light brown solid  that are soluble in polar organic solvents.  It is a precursor to certain dyes.

Preparation and use
1,5-Dihydroxynaphthalene is prepared from naphthalene-1,5-disulfonic acid by hydrolysis with strong base followed by acidification.

It couples with various aryl diazonium salts to give diazo dyes.  Oxidation with chromium trioxide gives juglone, a naturally occurring dye.

In supramolecular chemistry, 1,5-dihydroxynaphthalene is a popular reagent.

References

Naphthols